John Cox (1911 – 17 September 1990) was a Scottish football player and manager. He served Hamilton Academical (where he spent the majority of his playing career, making over 200 appearances in the right half position), Ayr United and St Mirren (the latter as a World War II guest) as both player and manager. He also had a short spell in English football with Preston North End, and after the conflict ended he finished his career with Stranraer.

His cousin Sammy Cox was also a footballer who played at international level for Scotland and at club level for Rangers; while manager at Hamilton, he signed his nephew – also John/Jackie – for the club, although the younger Cox made only one league appearance for Accies (he also featured for Stranraer, and briefly for Kilmarnock).

Honours

Player
Hamilton Academical 
Scottish Cup: runner-up 1934–35

Manager
Ayr United
Scottish Football League Division Two: 1958–59

Managerial statistics

References

1911 births
1990 deaths
Footballers from East Ayrshire
Scottish footballers
Association football wing halves
Scottish Junior Football Association players
Darvel F.C. players
Scottish Football League players
Hamilton Academical F.C. players
Ayr United F.C. players
Stranraer F.C. players
English Football League players
Preston North End F.C. players
Partick Thistle F.C. wartime guest players
Hamilton Academical F.C. wartime guest players
St Mirren F.C. wartime guest players
Scottish football managers
Scottish Football League managers
Hamilton Academical F.C. managers
St Mirren F.C. managers
Ayr United F.C. managers